Choy Lee Fut known as Fight the Fight in the USA (Chinese: 蔡李佛) is a 2011 Hong Kong action film directed by Tony Law and Sam Wong, starring Sammo Hung, Yuen Wah, Sammy Hung, Kane Kosugi and Stephen Wong, with special appearances by Lau Kar-wing and Dennis To.

Cast
 Sammo Hung as Chan Tin Loi (陳天來)
 Yuen Wah as Chan Tin Cheuk (陳天爵)
 Sammy Hung as Chan Wai Yip (陳偉業)
 Kane Kosugi as Mo Tin Siu Cho / Takeda Shosa (武田少佐)
 Stephen Wong as Cho Cheung Hung (左長空)
 Wang Jiayin as Ha Yu Fei (夏羽飛)
 Lau Kar Wing
 Dennis To
 Sam Wong as Qian Xin
 Ian Powers as X-Man
 Lau Wing Kin
 Li Chenxi
 Su Qianwei
 Joshua Dalisay

References

External links
 
 

2011 films
2011 action films
Hong Kong action films
Hong Kong martial arts films
Kung fu films
Wushu films
2010s Cantonese-language films
Martial arts tournament films
2011 martial arts films
2010s Hong Kong films